Scotland is an unincorporated community in southwestern Van Buren County, Arkansas, United States, near the head of the South Fork of the Little Red River. In April 2010, a tornado struck this community which resulted in extreme damage.

Education 
Public education for elementary and secondary school students is provided by the Clinton School District, which leads students to graduate from Clinton High School.

Scotland was a part of the Scotland School District until July 1, 2004, when that district consolidated with the Alread School District into the existing Clinton school district.

References

Unincorporated communities in Van Buren County, Arkansas
Unincorporated communities in Arkansas